The 1916 United States Senate election in Wisconsin was held on November 7, 1916.

Incumbent Republican U.S. Senator Robert M. La Follette was re-elected to a third term in office over Democrat William F. Wolfe and Socialist Richard Elsner.

Republican primary

Candidates
Malcomb G. Jeffris
Robert M. La Follette, incumbent Senator since 1906

Results

Democratic primary

Candidates
 William F. Wolfe, U.S. Attorney for the Western District of Wisconsin

Results

Socialist primary

Candidates
 Richard Elsner, Milwaukee County judge

Results

Prohibition primary

Candidates
 Charles L. Hill

Results

General election

Candidates
 Charles L. Hill (Prohibition)
 William F. Wolfe, U.S. Attorney for the Western District of Wisconsin (Democratic)
 Robert M. La Follette, incumbent Senator since 1906 (Republican)
 Richard Elsner, Milwaukee County judge (Socialist)

Results

See also 
 1916 United States Senate elections

References 

1916
Wisconsin
United States Senate